The United States Sanitary Commission (USSC) was a private relief agency created by federal legislation on June 18, 1861, to support sick and wounded soldiers of the United States Army (Federal / Northern / Union Army) during the American Civil War. It operated across the North, raised an estimated $25 million in Civil War era revenue (assuming 1865 dollars, $ million in ) and in-kind contributions to support the cause, and enlisted thousands of volunteers. The president was Henry Whitney Bellows, and Frederick Law Olmsted acted as executive secretary. It was modeled on the British Sanitary Commission, set up during the Crimean War (1853-1856), and from the British parliamentary report published after the Indian Rebellion of 1857 ("Sepoy Rebellion").

History

Henry Whitney Bellows, (1814-1882), a Massachusetts clergyman, planned the USSC and served as its only president. According to The Wall Street Journal, "its first executive secretary was Frederick Law Olmsted, (1822-1903), the famed landscape architect who designed New York's Central Park". George Templeton Strong, (1820-1875), New York lawyer and diarist, helped found the commission and served as treasurer and member of the executive committee.

In June 1861, the Sanitary Commission set up its central office inside the United States Treasury Building, just east of the Executive Mansion (now the White House), on Pennsylvania Avenue and 15th Street in central Washington, D.C. By late October 1861, the USSC  Central Office and the U.S. War Department had received detailed studies and reports from the Sanitary Inspectors of more than four hundred regimental camp inspections. The rapidly crowded events of those first six months of the war displayed the sheer gravity of the situation in which the adjustment to the means and agencies were desperately needed to ensure a high health-rate in all those untrained Union Army regiments.

Immediately following the First Battle of Bull Run in July 1861, the first orders and receipts submitted to the Central Office began to arrive from the military Union Army hospitals at Alexandria, Virginia, and Washington, D.C., requesting water-beds, small tables for writing in bed, iron wire cradles for protecting wounded limbs, dominoes, checkerboards, Delphinium and hospital gowns for the wounded.

The demands of the war soon required more frequent decision-making. This led to the creation of the Standing Committee, which met on a nearly daily basis in New York City where most of its members resided. The Standing Committee initially consisted of five commissioners who retained their position for the entire war: Henry W. Bellows, George Templeton Strong, William H. Van Buren, M.D., Cornelius R. Agnew, M.D., and Wolcott Gibbs, M.D.

In addition to setting up and staffing hospitals, the USSC operated 30 soldiers' homes, lodges, or rest houses for traveling or disabled Union soldiers. Most of these closed shortly after the war.

Also active in the association was Colonel Leavitt Hunt, (1831-1907), a New York lawyer and pioneering photographer. In January 1864, he wrote to 16th President Abraham Lincoln's secretary John George Nicolay asking that Nicolay forward him any documents he might have available with the President's signature. Hunt's mother, the widow of Vermont congressman Jonathan Hunt, planned to attach Lincoln's signature to copies of several casts of the President's hand, to be sold to raise funds for the war effort. Other fund raising events included the famous 50 pound sack of flour that was auctioned off by Reuel Colt Gridley. By auctioning off the same sack of flour, which was then re-donated to be sold again, Gridley eventually raised more than $250,000.00 for the Sanitary Commission.

States could use their own tax money to supplement the Commission's work, as Ohio did. Under the energetic leadership of Governor David Tod, a War Democrat who won office on a coalition "Union Party" ticket with Republicans, Ohio acted vigorously. Following the unexpected carnage at the Battle of Shiloh in April 1862, it sent three steamboats to the scene as floating hospitals with doctors, nurses and medical supplies. The state fleet expanded to eleven hospital ships. The state also set up 12 local offices in main transportation nodes to help Ohio soldiers moving back and forth.

The government constructed the Pension Building in Washington, DC to handle all the staff to process the pension requests and administer them. It is now listed on the National Register of Historic Places. After the war, the USSC volunteers continued to work with Union Army veterans to secure their bounties, back pay, and apply for pensions. It supported the "health and hygiene" of the veterans. They had a Department of General Relief which accepted donations for veterans, too. The USSC organization was finally disbanded in May 1866.

Women in the USSC

Arising from a meeting in New York City of the Women's Central Relief Association of New York, the organization was also inspired by the British Sanitary Commission of the Crimean War. The American volunteers raised money (estimated at $25 million), collected donations, made uniforms, worked as nurses, ran kitchens in army camps, and administered hospital ships, soldiers' homes, lodges, and rests for traveling or disabled soldiers. They organized Sanitary Fairs in numerous cities to support the Federal army with funds and supplies, and to raise funds for the work of the USSC. Women who were prominent in the organization, often traveling great distances, and working in harsh conditions, included Louisa May Alcott, Almira Fales, Eliza Emily Chappell Porter, Katherine Prescott Wormeley, and many others.

Dorothea Dix, serving as the commission's superintendent, convinced the medical corps of the value of women working in their hospitals.  Over 15,000 women volunteered to work in hospitals, usually in nursing care. They assisted surgeons during procedures, gave medicines, supervised the feedings and cleaned the bedding and clothes. They gave good cheer, wrote letters the men dictated, and comforted the dying.  A representative nurse was Helen L. Gilson (1835–68) of Chelsea, Massachusetts, who served in Sanitary Commission. She supervised supplies, dressed wounds, and cooked special foods for patients on a limited diet. She worked in hospitals after the battles of Antietam, Fredericksburg, Chancellorsville, Gettysburg. She was a successful administrator, especially at the hospital for black soldiers at City Point, Virginia. The middle-class women who volunteered provided vitally needed nursing services and were rewarded with a sense of patriotism and civic duty in addition to the opportunity to demonstrate their skills and gain new ones, while receiving wages and sharing the hardships of the men.

Mary Livermore, Mary Ann Bickerdyke, and Annie Wittenmeyer played leadership roles. After the war some nurses wrote memoirs of their experiences; examples include Dix, Livermore, Sarah Palmer Young, and Sarah Emma Edmonds. Bridget Diver also worked for the Commission.

Sanitary Fairs

From the outset, many local groups sponsored fund-raising events to benefit the Commission. As the war progressed, these became larger and more elaborate Sanitary Fairs. One of the first events was in Lowell, Massachusetts, 1863. Groups in other cities soon adopted this plan. Organizing these Sanitary Fairs offered ways for local communities to be directly part of supporting the war effort of the nation. The largest Sanitary Fair during the war was held in Chicago in 1863. Chicago held a second sanitary fair in 1865.

Notable members

Louisa May Alcott served as a nurse for the Sanitary Commission at a Union Army Hospital in Georgetown.
Martia L. Davis Berry raised supplies for the Great Northwestern Sanitary Fair (Chicago, 1865), receiving medal No. 15 for her services
Mary Ann Bickerdyke served as a nurse for the Sanitary Commission and is credited with establishing 300 field hospitals during the Civil War
Henry Whitney Bellows served as the President of the Commission.
 Atherton Blight, served as a Director of the Commission.
Samuel Howe served as a Director of the Commission.
Mary Livermore led the Northwestern Branch of the Sanitary Commission
John Strong Newberry
Frederick Law Olmsted served as the Executive Secretary of the Sanitary Commission.
George Templeton Strong was Treasurer of the Commission

Legacy
The U.S. Sanitary Commission is memorialized by a group of re-enactors who portray the Boston branch of the commission at various civic events, educational programs, and Civil War re-enactments. The group is based out of the Greater Boston area of Massachusetts.

Gallery

See also
 United States Christian Commission, a similar organization
 Western Sanitary Commission, a smaller rival based in St. Louis
 Hospital Ships of the Sanitary Commission

Notes

References

Further reading
 Attie, Jeanie.  Patriotic Toil: Northern Women and the American Civil War (1998), focus on the Sanitary Commission  online edition
 Bremner, Robert Hamlett.  The Public Good: Philanthropy and Welfare in the Civil War Era.  New York: Knopf, 1980.
 Brockett, Linus Pierpont.  The Philanthropic Results of the War in America.  New York: Sheldon & Co., 1864.
 Catalogue of the Department of Arms and Trophies Donated and Exhibited at the Northwestern Sanitary Fair, Held at Chicago, Illinois, May 30th to June 21st, 1865 including United States Flags Carried in Different Battles, Captured Rebel Flags, Autographs, Photographs, Etc.  Chicago: Rounds and James, 1865.
 Catalogue of Paintings, Statuary, Etc. Exhibited for the Benefit of Ladies' North-Western Fair, In Aid of the Chicago Branch of the U.S. Sanitary Commission, For the Relief of Soldiers.  Chicago, 1863.
 Coatsworth, Stella S.  The Loyal People of the North-West, A Record of Prominent Persons, Places and Events, During Eight Years of Unparalleled American History.  Chicago: Church, Goodman & Donnelley, 1869.
 Giesberg, Judith Ann. Civil War Sisterhood: The U.S. Sanitary Commission and Women's Politics in Transition (2006)
 Gordon, Beverly. "A Furor of Benevolence." Chicago History 15, no. 4 (1986): 48-65.
 Martin, Justin. Genius of Place: The Life of Frederick Law Olmsted (2011) pp 178–230
 Maxwell, William Quentin. Lincoln's Fifth Wheel: The Political History of the U.S. Sanitary Commission (1956) online edition
 Olmsted, Frederick Law. The Papers of Frederick Law Olmsted. Vol. 4: Defending the Union: The Civil War and the U.S. Sanitary Commission, 1861-1863 (1986) excerpt and text search
 Schnell, Christopher J. "Mary Livermore and the Great Northwestern Fair." Chicago History 4, no. 1 (1975): 34-43.
 Tise, Pam. "A Fragile Legacy: The Contributions of Women in the United States Sanitary Commission to the United States Administrative State" (Applied research project). Texas State University. (2013)
Mark Twain in his book "Roughing It" has a small section, Chapter 43, on the activities of the Commission in Virginia City, NV.

External links

 United States Sanitary Commission records, 1861-1879 (bulk 1861-1872), held by the Manuscripts and Archives Division, New York Public Library
 The United States Sanitary Commission Philadelphia Branch collection, containing materials on several humanitarian efforts made by the association during the Civil War, are available for research use at the Historical Society of Pennsylvania.
 List of 30 USSC soldiers' homes, lodges, and rests in 25 cities in 15 states North and South in 1865.

 
1861 establishments in the United States
1866 disestablishments in the United States
Government agencies established in 1861
Organizations disestablished in 1866
Veterans' affairs in the United States
Old soldiers' homes in the United States